Lycorma meliae is a planthopper indigenous to Taiwan.

Taxonomy and discovery 
L. meliae is a species in the genus Lycorma, in the planthopper family Fulgoridae, subfamily Aphaeninae. Species within this genus are found in Asia. L. meliae, along with L. olivacea, was described by Masayo Kato in Taiwan in 1929 and the species has not been reclassified since. Taxonomic classification places three other species (L. delicatula, L. olivacea, and L. imperialis) as closely related to L. meliae.

Evolution and distribution 
Lycorma meliae is native to Taiwan. L. meliae and L. olivacea are the only two members of the genus restricted to Taiwan. 

Lycorma meliae, along with the rest of the genus Lycorma, are parasitized by the eupelmid wasp Anastatus orientalis and by Dryinus sinicus, a dryinid wasp.

See also 
 Lycorma
 Lycorma delicatula
 Lycorma imperialis
 Lycorma olivacea

References 

Aphaeninae
Hemiptera of Asia
Insects described in 1929